Rabbi Yaakov Yitzchak Galinsky (December 15, 1920 - January 23, 2014) was described as "a scion of Yeshivas Novardok in Bialystok, and one of the last maggidim remaining in our generation."

Galinsky, described as "diminutive in stature but towering in personality ... kept crowds enthralled" was once told that since so many people are dreaming of the future, his job as Maggid (in his travels to "immigrant communities throughout Eretz Yisroel") should not be to give them Mussar but rather to wake them up, and each will do his part.

Biography
He was born "5681/1921 in Krinek, Poland" to Devorah and Rabbi Avraham Tzvi Galinsky.

Galinsky's first yeshiva, Yeshivas Novardok in Bialystok, had only "a few shelves" of reference texts, so people waited in line and, while waiting, sharpened their understanding.

In 1939, with others of the yeshiva, he fled but was captured by Russia and exiled to Siberia. Upon release he "traveled to Zambul, Kazakhstan, in Eastern Russia" and helped found a Jewish school in which he taught.

He married Tzivia Brod, a daughter of a Lubavitcher Chassid; in 1949, they came to Israel, where Galinsky helped found a yeshiva.

Upon his passing, 47 days after his 4 Teves/December 13, 2013, his 93rd birthday, his survivors included "children, grandchildren, great-grandchildren and great-great grandchildren."

Published works
 Vehigadeta - a series of works available in the original Hebrew and also English translation.
 Lehaggid

References

 Rav Yaakov Galinsky - The Legendary Maggid with the Fiery Spirit of Novardik, by Rebbetzin G. Lehrer, Feldheim, 

Rosh yeshivas
Maggidim
20th-century Polish rabbis
1920 births
2014 deaths
Novardok Yeshiva alumni
20th-century Israeli rabbis